is a Japanese singer, songwriter and actress. She lived in Osaka, Osaka Prefecture until junior high school and moved to the Kantō region when she had a high school opportunity. She is nicknamed  and sonko.

Discography
※Oricon Weekly Chart highest ranking.

Singles

Albums

Mini-albums

Music videos

Tie-ups

Live performances

Solo live performances

Appearing events

Filmography

TV drama

Internet series

Films

TV series

Stage

Radio

Advertisements, public relations

Others

Awards
Sky PerfecTV! Movie Channel Award (Watashitachi no Haahaa)
Fanta Land Award (Watashitachi no Haahaa)

Notes

References

See also
Especia, girl group who shared the same office as Inoue

External links
 
 
 

1997 births
Living people
Actors from Kobe
Japanese women pop singers
Japanese women singer-songwriters
Japanese singer-songwriters
Japanese guitarists
Musicians from Kobe
21st-century Japanese singers
21st-century Japanese women singers
21st-century guitarists
21st-century women guitarists